There are several Marshall Middle Schools in the United States.

They include:

Marshall Middle School (Long Beach), California
Marshall Middle School (Olympia), Washington
Marshall Middle School (Pittsburgh, Pennsylvania)
Marshall Middle School (San Diego), California
Marshall Middle School (Virginia), in Warrenton, Virginia